David Motta Soares (born March 13, 1997) is a Brazilian classical ballet dancer. He was a leading soloist with the Bolshoi Ballet. In May 2022 David became a Principal Dancer with the Berlin State Ballet.

Biography
Born in Cabo Frio, David Motta Soares began his dance studies at the Regina and Ofelia Corvello Ballet School in 2007. After the Youth America Grand Prix competition in New York, he was invited to attend the Annual Bolshoi Ballet Academy Summer Intensive in Middlebury, Connecticut in 2010. At the age of 12 he left Brazil for Moscow to enter the Bolshoi Ballet Academy. Whilst a student, he performed in Harlequinade, Nacho Duato's «L’amorosso», and danced the Grand Pas Classique (music by Daniel Auber, choreography by Victor Gzovsky). In 2014 David performed as Colas in La Fille mal gardée at the stage of the Bolshoi Theatre and participated in the Academy's tour to Milan and Rome. At his graduation concert he danced the pas de deux from Don Quixote. 

He graduated in 2015 and was accepted in the Bolshoi Ballet as a member of the corps de ballet. Within two years, with Vladimir Nikonov as mentor, he was given the leading roles in the ballets Gisele, The Nutcracker, and Swan Lake as well as taking part in the Bolshoi contemporary productions. 

David has participated in the Bolshoi Ballet tours to Europe, Asia, America and Australia.

Roles

With the Bolshoi Theatre
2015
French Doll in The Nutcracker, Yuri Grigorovich's production

2016
Piggy-Wiggy in Moidodyr (Wash'em Clean), Yuri Smekalov's production
Grand Pas and Bernard in Raymonda, Yuri Grigorovich's production
Count Albrecht in Giselle, Yuri Grigorovich's production
Juliet's Friend in Romeo and Juliet, Yuri Grigorovich's production
Soloist in George Balanchine's Diamonds
Leading dancer in George Balanchine's Emeralds
The Bronze Idol in La Bayadère, choreography by Marius Petipa, Yuri Grigorovich's version 
Pechorin in A Hero of Our Time (Part 2 "Taman"), choreography by Yuri Possokhov
The Prince in The Nutcracker, Yuri Grigorovich's production

2017
Principal Dancer in Etudes, Harold Lander's production
Pechorin in A Hero of Our Time (Part 1 "Bela"), choreography by Yuri Possokhov
Antoine Mistral in Flames of Paris, choreography by Alexei Ratmansky with use of the original choreography by Vasily Vainonen
The Evil Genius in Swan Lake, Yuri Grigorovich's production with use of the original choreography by Marius Petipa
Torero in Carmen Suite, choreography by Alberto Alonso
Grand Gala in Nureyev, choreography by Yuri Possokhov, designed and directed by Kirill Serebrennikov

2018
Frantz in Coppélia, revival and new version by Sergei Vikharev
Fisherman in The Pharaoh's Daughter, Pierre Lacotte's production
Basilio in Don Quixote, Alexei Fadeyechev's production
Moor in Petrushka, Edward Clug's production
Two couples in Artifact suite, William Forsythe's production
Romeo in Romeo and Juliet, Alexei Ratmansky's production

2019
Lord Wilson-Taor in The Pharaoh's Daughter, Pierre Lacotte's production
Florizel, prince of Bohemia in The Winter's Tale, Christopher Wheeldon's production
Ballet Dancer in The Bright Stream, Alexei Ratmansky's production
Friend to Ferkhad in A Legend of Love, Yuri Grigorovich's production
Leading Soloist of Parts III and IV, Soloist of Part I and IV in Symphony in C, George Balanchine's production
Lover and Bim's friend in Gaîté Parisienne, Maurice Bejart's production
Leading dancer in George Balanchine's Rubies

2020
Roles in The Ninth Wave, choreography by Bryan Arias — appeared in the opening night performance
Soloist in the Silentium, choreography by Martin Chaix — appeared in the opening night performance
Espada in Don Quixote, Alexei Fadeyechev's production
Blue Bird in The Sleeping Beauty, new version by Yuri Grigorovich
Count Albrecht in Giselle, Alexei Ratmansky's production

2021
Boys, Cavalier Orlando, and five other roles in Orlando, Christian Spuck's production — appeared in the opening night performance
Ferkhad in A Legend of Love, Yuri Grigorovich's production
Shelmerdine / Elizabeth I in Orlando, Christian Spuck's production

2022
James in La Sylphide, choreography by August Bournonville in a version by Johan Kobborg

With the Berlin State Opera
2022
Prince Desiré in The Sleeping Beauty, choreography by Marcia Haydée after Marius Petipa
Count Albrecht in Giselle, choreography Patrice Bart after Jean Coralli and Jules Perrot
Prince Siegfried in Swan Lake, choreography by Patrice Bart

As Guest Star
2022
Prince Siegfried in Swan Lake, Jorge Texeira's production with use of the original choreography by Marius Petipa — Theatro Municipal Ballet, Rio de Janeiro, Brazil (partner — Cláudia Mota).

Tours
2017

Tour of the Bolshoi Ballet at the Biwako Hall Center for the Performing Arts, Otsu and Tokyo Bunka Kaikan, Tokyo, Japan

Antoine Mistral (Flames of Paris, choreography by Alexei Ratmansky with use of the original choreography by Vasily Vainonen) — debut

2018

Tour of the Bolshoi Ballet at the National Centre for the Performing Arts, Beijing, China:

Pas des esclaves (Le Corsaire, choreography by Alexei Ratmansky and Yury Burlaka)

Antoine Mistral (Flames of Paris, choreography by Alexei Ratmansky with use of the original choreography by Vasily Vainonen)

Tour of the Bolshoi Ballet at the Seoul Arts Center, Seoul, Korea:

The Evil Genius in Swan Lake (production by Yuri Grigorovich)

Tour of the Bolshoi Ballet at the Aspendos theatre, Turkey:

Pas de deux from The Talisman
Pas de deux from Coppelia

2019

Tour of the Bolshoi Ballet at the Queensland Performing Arts Centre, Brisbane, Australia:

Leading dancer in Emeralds and Rubies, soloist in Diamonds (choreography by George Balanchine)

Tour of the Bolshoi Ballet at the Royal Opera House, London, UK:

The Evil Genius in Swan Lake (production by Yuri Grigorovich)
Basilio in Don Quixote (production by Alexei Fadeyechev)

Filmography 

 2019 — as The Bronze Idol in La Bayadère, broadcast by Pathé Live from the Bolshoi Theater.

Awards
2014 — 2nd prize at the V International Yury Grigorovich Competition «Young Ballet of the World» in Sochi
2015 — 1st prize at the II All-Russia Young Dancer's Competition Russian Ballet.
2019 — Nominated for the National theatre award “The Golden Mask” as the best actor in Ballet/Contemporary Dance.

References

1997 births
Living people
People from Cabo Frio
Brazilian male ballet dancers
Bolshoi Ballet